"El Préstamo" is a song recorded by Colombian singer Maluma. It was released on 9 March 2018, as the third single from Maluma's third studio album F.A.M.E. (2018). It was written by Maluma, Bryan Lezcano, Kevin Jimenez and Edgar Barrera, and produced by the Rude Boyz and Edge.

Music video
The music video for "El Préstamo" premiered on 9 March 2018 on Maluma's Vevo account on YouTube. It was directed by Jessy Terrero and it features American model Jenny Watwood. The video begins with Maluma and his girlfriend (Watwood) in a motel room where he is having a call and then tells Watwood to be prepared for tomorrow. The video then shifts to Maluma and Watwood entering a bank disguised as a wealthy couple in order to gain access to the bank's safe. Putting their plan into motion, he and Watwood break into the bank that night using a red gas bomb and proceed to steal a large amount of money. As Maluma and Watwood escape, two police cars approach them with Watwood overpowering them with a gun. The video ends with Watwood who betrays Maluma by abandoning him to the police, keeping the money for herself and the video cuts to black with the words "To Be Continued" just as he kneels down with two guns and is ordered to come out with his hands up, thus leaving his fate unknown.

Track listing

Charts

Weekly charts

Year-end charts

Certifications

Release history

See also
List of Billboard number-one Latin songs of 2018

References

2018 songs
2018 singles
Maluma songs
Spanish-language songs
Latin pop songs
Sony Music Latin singles
Sony Music Colombia singles
Songs written by Edgar Barrera
Songs written by Maluma (singer)
Song recordings produced by Edgar Barrera
Music videos directed by Jessy Terrero